Erko is a predominantly Estonian masculine given name. It is a cognate of the given name Eric. Other Estonian variants include Erik, Eeri, Eerik, Eero, Ergi, Ergo, Erich, Erik, Erki, and Erkki. 

As of 1 January 2023, 359 men in Estonian bear the first name Erko, making it the 345th most popular male name in the country. 

People named Erko include:
 (born 1985), jet skier
Erko Laurimaa (born 1987), rock guitarist (Smilers)
Erko Saviauk (born 1977), footballer and manager
Erko Jonne Tõugjas (born 2003), footballer

References

Estonian masculine given names